Matana Roberts (born 1975) is an American sound experimentalist, visual artist, jazz saxophonist and clarinetist, composer and improviser based in New York City. They have previously been an active member of the Association for the Advancement of Creative Musicians (AACM).

The works in their multichapter Coin Coin project have received wide acclaim: Coin Coin Chapter One: Gens de Couleur Libres was named in multiple JazzTimes 2011 Critics’ Lists; Coin Coin Chapter Two: Mississippi Moonchile was called "stunning" by both the Chicago Reader and SPIN; and Coin Coin Chapter Three: River Run Thee was named among Rolling Stone'''s Best Avant Albums of 2015. Coin Coin Chapter Four: Memphis has garnered their greatest accolades, and was included in Pitchfork's Best Experimental Albums, Bandcamp's Best Jazz Albums, and the top ten of the NPR Music Jazz Critics Poll in 2019. Anthony Fantano of The Needle Drop called the album "one of the decade's most compelling jazz projects".

The annual DownBeat Critics Poll has named Roberts Rising Star in both the alto saxophone and clarinet categories. Roberts received a Doris Duke Impact Award in 2014 and a Doris Duke Artist Award in 2016.

Early life and career

Born in 1975 in Chicago, Illinois, Roberts was raised on the city's South Side and studied classical clarinet during their youth. They formed a trio, Sticks and Stones, with bassist Josh Abrams and drummer Chad Taylor, with whom they regularly performed at the Velvet Lounge. In 2002, Roberts moved to New York, initially busking in subways and publishing a zine, Fat Ragged, about their experiences.

Roberts is the composer of Coin Coin, a multichapter musical work-in-progress exploring themes of history, memory and ancestry. Roberts performed at the London Jazz Festival in 2007. In 2008, Central Control released Roberts' The Chicago Project. The album, produced by Vijay Iyer, includes performances by members of Prefuse 73 and Tortoise along with AACM saxophonist Fred Anderson.

They have previously been a member of the Association for the Advancement of Creative Musicians (AACM).

In January 2010, Roberts was the guest curator at The Stone. Roberts was chosen by Jeff Mangum of Neutral Milk Hotel to perform at the All Tomorrow's Parties festival that he curated in March 2012 in Minehead, England. Roberts held a residency at the Whitney Museum of American Art in the summer of 2015, during which they produced a series of research-based sound works entitled i call america. The following summer, they had a solo show at the Fridman Gallery entitled I Call America II that was presented as an expanded version of the Whitney exhibition.

Awards
2006: Van Lier Fellowship
2008: The Jazz Journalists Association "Up and Coming Musician of the Year" nominee
2013: Foundation for Contemporary Arts Grants to Artists Award
 2014: Doris Duke Impact Award
 2016: Doris Duke Artist Award
 2017: DownBeat Critics Poll, Rising Star Alto Saxophone
 2018: DownBeat Critics Poll, Rising Star Clarinet

Discography

Solo / as band leader
 Lines for Lacy (self-release, 2006)
 The Calling (Utech, 2007)
 The Chicago Project (Central Control, 2008)
 Live in London (Central Control, 2011)
 Coin Coin Chapter One: Gens de couleur libres (Constellation, 2011)
 Coin Coin Chapter Two: Mississippi Moonchile (Constellation, 2013)
 Coin Coin Chapter Three: River Run Thee (Constellation, 2015), solo
 Always (Relative Pitch, 2015), solo
 Coin Coin Chapter Four: Memphis (Constellation, 2019)

As collaborator / side musician
 Sticks and Stones (482 Music, 2002)
 Sticks and Stones, Shed Grace (Thrill Jockey, 2004)
 DePaul University Jazz Ensemble, Bob Lark, Shade Street (Blue Birdland, 1999)
 Ras Moshe and the Music Now Society, Schematic (Jump Arts, 2002)
 Ayelet Gottlieb, InTernal/ExTernal (Genivieve, 2004)
 Matt Bauder, Paper Gardens (rec. 2006; 482 Music, 2010)
 Guillermo E. Brown, Handeheld (Melanine Harmonique, 2008)
 Exploding Star Orchestra featuring Roscoe Mitchell (/ Rob Mazurek), Matter Anti-Matter (Rogueart, 2013)
 Matana Roberts, Sam Shalabi, Nicolas Caloia, Feldspar (Tour de Bras, 2014)
 Matana Roberts / Savion Glover / Reg E. Gaines, If 'Trane Was (SG self release)?
 Matana Roberts / Pat Thomas, The Truth (Otoroku, 2020)

With Burnt Sugar
 Not April in Paris (Live from Banlieus Bleues) (TruGroid, 2004)
 If You Can’t Dazzle Them with Your Brilliance, Then Baffle Them with Your Blisluth (TruGroid, 2005)
 More Than Posthuman – Rise of the Mojosexual Cotillion (TruGroid, 2006)
 Making Love to the Dark Ages (LiveWired, 2009)

As guest artist
 Godspeed You! Black Emperor, Yanqui U.X.O. (Constellation, 2002), on "Rockets Fall on Rocket Falls"
 Various artists, Juncture (Pi, 2004), with Vijay Iyer: "Imperium (Peace Prize/War Crimes)"
 Daniel Givens, Dayclear & First Dark (Aesthetics, 2005), on "Rolling Blackout" 
 Savath and Savalas, Golden Pollen (Anti-, 2007), on "Te amo...¿Por que me odias?"
 TV on the Radio, Dear Science (4AD/Interscope, 2008), on "Lover's Day"
 Alexandre Pierrepont / Mike Ladd, Maison Hantée (RogueArt, 2008), on "Chamber 72"
 Thee Silver Mt. Zion Memorial Orchestra, Kollaps Tradixionales (Constellation, 2010), on "There Is a Light"
 Deerhoof, Mountain Moves (Joyful Noise, 2017), on "Mountain Moves"
 Krononaut, Krononaut (Glitterbeat, 2020), on "Wealth of Nations," "Examen," and "Convocation"

References

External links

Interview with Christopher Stackhouse in Bomb Magazine

1975 births
Living people
African-American women composers
African-American jazz composers
American jazz composers
African-American jazz musicians
American women jazz musicians
American jazz alto saxophonists
American women composers
Jazz musicians from Illinois
Jazz musicians from New York (state)
Musicians from Chicago
Musicians from New York City
21st-century American composers
21st-century American saxophonists
Women jazz saxophonists
21st-century American women musicians
Constellation Records (Canada) artists
RogueArt artists
21st-century women composers
21st-century jazz composers
African-American women musicians
21st-century African-American women
21st-century African-American musicians
20th-century African-American people
20th-century African-American women